Joël Müller (born 2 January 1952 in Donchery, France) is a former professional football player and manager. He works as a technical director for FC Metz. While at Metz he led them to victory in the 1995–96 Coupe de la Ligue.

References

Living people
1952 births
French footballers
Association football defenders
Ligue 1 players
FC Metz players
OGC Nice players
Olympique Lyonnais players
French football managers
FC Metz managers
RC Lens managers
Ligue 1 managers
USL Dunkerque players